This is a list of Croatian television related events from 2015.

Events
22 March – X Factor Adria debuts in Croatia, airing on RTL.
25 April - Nina Kraljić wins the first season of The Voice – Najljepši glas Hrvatske.
21 June - Amel Ćurić from Bosnia and Herzegovina wins the second season of X Factor Adria.
12 December - Darko Petkovski from Macedonia wins the fifth season of Veliki brat.

Debuts
17 January – The Voice – Najljepši glas Hrvatske (2015–present)
22 March – X Factor Adria (2015–present)
4 September - Veliki brat (2011-2013, 2015–present)

Television shows

Ending this year

Births

Deaths

See also
2015 in Croatia